Roman Catholic Diocese of San Fernando may refer to the following Latin Catholic dioceses :

 the current Roman Catholic Diocese of San Fernando de Apure, in Venezuela
 the former Roman Catholic Diocese of San Fernando de La Union, now a metropolitan Archdiocese, in the Philippines